Gustavo Scoppa (Naples, March 7, 1856 - ?) was an Italian painter, mainly of land- and particularly sea-scapes.

He studied under his father's instructions, then at the Academy of Fine Arts of Naples. He has exhibited at the Promotrice of Naples. Among his paintings: Il cantiere mercantile di Castellammare; Marina di Puzzano; Seascape of Mollo; Beach at Capri; and Shore of Sorrento.

References

1856 births
19th-century Neapolitan people
19th-century Italian painters
Italian male painters
Painters from Naples
Italian landscape painters
Year of death missing
19th-century Italian male artists